Sreekrishnapuram Krishnankutty is a Malayalam short story writer born on 15 June 1947.

Life

He was born in a village called Sreekrishnapuram near Cherpulassery in Palakkad District of Kerala State, South India. He attended Sreekrishnapuram HSS and completed TTC from Anakkara. 

He gained Bachelor and Master of Arts degrees in Malayalam Literature followed by B.Ed. from Calicut University. He started his career as a teacher for lower primary students and then moved to Moyan Girls High school, Palakkad. He retired from Government Higher Secondary School Alanallur in 2001. Currently he is working as the Principal of Mannampatta TTI.

Works 

 Karnnan (Novel)
 Oru Verum Sakshi Mathram
 Nilavilipole
 Kannadiyil Kanathathu
 Daivathinte Komali
 Thavalam
 Manassilekkoru Palam (In Press)

Awards and recognitions 
 National Award for Best Teacher 2001
 M.S. Rudran Foundation Award 2007

References 

Malayalam short story writers
Malayalam-language writers
20th-century Indian short story writers
Malayali people
Writers from Kerala
1947 births
Living people
University of Calicut alumni
Educators from Kerala
Indian male short story writers
20th-century Indian male writers